"Vault of the Beast" is a science fiction short story by Canadian writer A. E. van Vogt.

Plot summary

Beings from another dimension have sent a living plastic "robot" to Earth to find the "greatest mathematical mind in the Solar System," and get that person to open a vault on Mars, containing one of the race of its creators. It is able to imitate any form of matter, and to tap the thoughts of the being it duplicates. The creature kills its way to one man, Jim Brender, who it believes is the man. The creature, in the form of another man, reveals that the Martian vault was built by the Ancient Martians, made up of an 'ultimate metal'. The vault is known as the "Tower of the Beast", located in a buried Martian city. It says that the key to opening it is 'factoring the ultimate prime number'.

Brender does not believe the tale and the creature causes a stock market crash, bankrupting Brender to achieve its aim. Brender is forced by his circumstances to take a job as a space pilot. The creature accompanies him to Mars, but is found out. He shoots it and weakens it, allowing its masters to take control of it.  They explain that the "Beast" imprisoned in the vault is actually a scientist of their kind, Kalorn, who discovered how to bridge their two spaces. They intend to use Kalorn's discovery to conquer all spaces.

To do this, they need to open the lock, a time lock. They get Brender to solve the combination, which is both simple and complex. However, releasing the lock has catastrophic consequences for Kalorn: exposed to the different time flow of our universe (billions of times faster), Kalorn ages into dust when the vault is opened.

The opening of the vault also destroys the robot. Brender returns to Earth again wealthy, the finder and thereby partial owner of the contents of the buried city, worth billions.

Publication history
After starting his writing career by writing for true-confession style pulp magazines, such as True Story, van Vogt decided to switch to writing something he enjoyed: science fiction. He was inspired by the August 1938 issue of Astounding Science Fiction, which he picked up at a newsstand. The story Who Goes There? by John W. Campbell, Jr. led him to write Vault of the Beast, which he submitted to that same magazine. "I read half of it standing there at the news-stand before I bought the issue and finished it. That brought me back into the fold with a vengeance. I still regard that as the best story Campbell ever wrote, and the best horror tale in science fiction."

Vault of the Beast initially received a positive rejection letter from Astounding Science Fiction; however, after van Vogt's subsequent story, Black Destroyer, was accepted and promoted as the cover story, Vault of the Beast was published in 1940, and has since been published in several collections and anthologies, such as Monsters, The Other Side of the Moon and Isaac Asimov Presents The Great SF Stories 2 (1940).

References

External links 
 
 Vault of the Beast at MathFiction.

1940 short stories
Short stories set on Mars
Short stories by A. E. van Vogt
Works originally published in Analog Science Fiction and Fact